The seventh series of the British television drama series Grange Hill began broadcasting on 3 January 1984, before ending on 2 March 1984 on BBC One. The series follows the lives of the staff and pupils of the eponymous school, an inner-city London comprehensive school. It consists of eighteen episodes.

Cast and characters

Pupils

Teachers

No longer with us 
Robert Hartley as Mr Keating - died on 16 October 1997

Episodes

Release History
The seventh series of Grange Hill was released on DVD on 11 November 2019. This series includes English subtitles on all 18 episodes on three DVD discs, with format of 4:3 and total running time of 449 mins. (7hrs 29min)

In 2021 the seventh series was released on the streaming platform BritBox.

Notes

References

1984 British television seasons
Grange Hill